The eNASCAR Coca-Cola iRacing Series (formerly PEAK Antifreeze iRacing Series and NASCAR iRacing World Championship) is the premiere esports league that is sanctioned by ENASCAR. The league began in 2010 and is one of the longest running, officially sanctioned, esports racing series. Coca-Cola was named the entitlement sponsor for 2020 after they agreed to be a Premier Partner for NASCAR.  The series is run through the iRacing simulation platform.

History 
With the growing popularity of professional e-sports in the 2000s, and growing viewership of the broadcasts, NASCAR decided to venture into the sport. This mover pre-dated other popular series such as Forza Racing Championship, Formula One Esports Series and IMSA GT Championship.

On February 9, 2010, the first ever NASCAR-sanctioned esports series began when Dale Earnhardt Jr. won the inaugural race at a simulated track of Daytona International Speedway. The series became one of the eSport World Championships that is recognized by iRacing and one three recognized eSport series sanctioned by NASCAR.

In 2014, the series gained its first entitlement sponsor when PEAK Antifreeze gained the naming rights. At that time the money pool was increased to $100,000. PEAK would remain the primary sponsor until 2020, when Coca-Cola took over and the money pool was tripled to $300,000.

Champions

Tracks

Current

Former

Format

Regular season 
The regular season consists of 16 rounds that begins in mid-February and ends in early October. A total of 40 racers compete for 8 spots in the playoffs. Points are gained for each race, earning one point per position (one point for 40th, two for 39th, etc.). Three bonus points are awarded for winning a race and one bonus point is awarded for leading a lap and leading the most laps. Only the best 12 out of 16 results count towards the driver's championship. The drivers with the most points qualify for the playoffs. Drivers receive $500 for a win, $300 for a second-place finish and $200 for a third-place finish for all races but the Daytona 500, which are increased.

Playoffs 
Points are reset beginning week 17 for the playoff qualifying drivers who are all set at 2,000 points. After three races, the drivers in the top four of the standings qualify for the Championship race and their points are set to 3,000. The driver with the highest number of points at the end of the series is named the champion. In 2020, the Champion will be awarded $100,000, second will receive $20,000, $15,000 for third, and $10,000 for fourth.

References

External links

 
 

Esports leagues
NASCAR video games
Esports competitions in the United States